Thailand participated the 2019 Southeast Asian Games in Philippines from 30 November to 11 December 2019.

Competitors

Medal summary

Medal by sport

Medal by date

Source:

Medalists

References

External links

Southeast Asian Games
2019
Nations at the 2019 Southeast Asian Games